Nueva Braunau (lit. New Braunau) is a Chilean village located in the commune of Puerto Varas, Southern Chile. It was founded mostly by Austro-Hungarian settlers (later called as Sudeten Germans) from Braunau, Bohemia (current Czech Republic) on 15 August 1877. The settlement originated as part of the German colonization of Valdivia, Osorno and Llanquihue.

External links 
 Information about New Braunau on the website of the Municipality of Puerto Varas (in Spanish)

References

Populated places in Llanquihue Province
Populated places established in 1877
Chile–Czech Republic relations
1877 establishments in Chile